Donja Rasovača is a village situated in Merošina municipality in Serbia.

References

Populated places in Nišava District